Tirepied-sur-Sée (literally Tirepied on Sée) is a commune in the Manche department in Normandy in north-western France. It is the result of the merger, on 1 January 2019, of the communes of Tirepied and La Gohannière.

See also
Communes of the Manche department

References 

Communes of Manche